Arthur Whitling (5 June 1892 – 8 January 1967) was an Australian rules footballer who played for the Collingwood Football Club in the Victorian Football League (VFL).

Notes

External links 
		
Arthur Whitling's profile at Collingwood Forever

1892 births
1967 deaths
Australian rules footballers from Victoria (Australia)
Collingwood Football Club players
Australian military personnel of World War I